Sheldon Bergstrom is a Canadian film, television and stage actor. In 2014, it was announced that he had been cast as Rob Ford in Factory Theatre's upcoming production of Rob Ford: The Musical.

Career 
Bergstrom's roles have included Edna Turnblad in Hairspray, Franz in The Producers, Horton in Seussical and Mr. Bumble in Oliver, as well as guest appearances in episodes of Corner Gas and InSecurity. He is also a frequent host of Telemiracle telethons in Saskatchewan.

Personal life 
Originally from Prince Albert, Saskatchewan, he is based in Regina.

Filmography

Film

Television

References

External links

Canadian male film actors
Canadian male television actors
Canadian male stage actors
Canadian male musical theatre actors
Male actors from Saskatchewan
People from Prince Albert, Saskatchewan
Living people
Year of birth missing (living people)